Empedaula is a genus of moths in the family Gelechiidae, similar to Aristotelia. It is found in South America and Asia and was first described in 1918 by Edward Meyrick in the periodical Exotic Microlepidoptera. The type specimen is Empedaula insipiens.

Species
Empedaula insipiens Meyrick, 1918
Empedaula phanerozona Meyrick, 1922
Empedaula rhodocosma (Meyrick, 1914)

References

External links

Empedaula on Barcode of Life Data Systems, includes an image

Gelechiinae
Taxa named by Edward Meyrick
Moth genera